Major General William Allan CIE FRSE (22 June 1832 – 12 July 1918) was a British general who served in the Crimean War. He was regimental Colonel of the Welsh Regiment.

Life

He was born on 22 June 1832.

From 1854 he served as a Lieutenant in the 41st Battalion Welsh Regiment in the Crimean War. Serving in the entire war he was at the Battle of Alma, Siege of Sebastopol and the Battle of Inkerman.

He retired to 43 Manor Place in Edinburgh's West End.

He died on 12 July 1918 in Bidborough in Kent. He is buried with his wife in Dean Cemetery in Edinburgh. The grave lies against the north wall of the Victorian north extension.

Family
He was married to Anne Campbell Penney (1844–1876).

Their son Major William Louis Campbell Allan (1871–1914) was killed near Bethune in the opening months of the First World War.

Artistic recognition
He was portrayed in uniform by Daniel A. Wehrschmidt. The portrait is held by the Welsh Regiment Museum at Brecon Beacons.

Publications
Crimean Letters

References

1832 births
1918 deaths
British Army major generals
British Army personnel of the Crimean War
Burials at the Dean Cemetery
41st Regiment of Foot officers
Fellows of the Royal Society of Edinburgh